The Sceptre and the Mace is a Canadian short documentary film, directed by John Howe and released in 1957. The film uses the royal visit by Queen Elizabeth II to Canada in 1957 to explore and explain the role of The Crown in a constitutional monarchy, focusing in particular on the opening of the 23rd Canadian Parliament, which remains to this day the only session of Parliament in Canadian history formally opened by the Queen herself rather than by the Governor General of Canada.

The film won the Canadian Film Award for Best Theatrical Short Film at the 10th Canadian Film Awards in 1958.

The film was later broadcast by CBC Television as an episode of the documentary series History Makers in 1970.

References

External links
 
 The Sceptre and the Mace at the National Film Board of Canada

1957 films
Best Theatrical Short Film Genie and Canadian Screen Award winners
Canadian short documentary films
1957 short films
Films shot in Ottawa
National Film Board of Canada documentaries
Documentary films about Canadian politics
1950s short documentary films
Films directed by John Howe (director)
1950s Canadian films